Leiocephalus barahonensis, commonly known as the orange-bellied curlytail or Barahona curlytail lizard, is a species of lizard in the family Leiocephalidae (curly-tailed lizard). It is endemic to Hispaniola, including some outlying islands.

Five subspecies are recognized:

However, IUCN and "Amphibians and reptiles of Caribbean Islands" treat Leiocephalus barahonensis altavelensis as a separate species, Leiocephalus altavelensis. This species/subspecies is endemic to Alto Velo Island and considered "critically endangered" with a total population size that is no more than 500 individuals.

References

Leiocephalus
Endemic fauna of Hispaniola
Reptiles of the Dominican Republic
Reptiles of Haiti
Reptiles described in 1921
Taxa named by Karl Patterson Schmidt